Luiz Eduardo Rodrigues (born 21 March 1987) is a Brazilian professional footballer who plays as a central defender for São Paulo FC.

Honours

Club
Chongqing Lifan
China League One: 2014

References

Living people
1987 births
Brazilian footballers
Clube Atlético Mineiro players
Associação Desportiva São Caetano players
Clube Atlético Bragantino players
China League One players
Chongqing Liangjiang Athletic F.C. players
São Paulo FC players
Campeonato Brasileiro Série A players
Association football defenders
Expatriate footballers in China
Brazilian expatriate sportspeople in China